Cramer v. United States, 325 U.S. 1 (1945), was a case in which the Supreme Court of the United States reviewed the conviction of Anthony Cramer, a German-born naturalized citizen, for treason.

Background

Anthony Cramer, a German-born mechanic, had associated with two Germans, Werner Thiel and Edward Kerling, one of whom he had prior business dealings with. The two were later found to be in the United States for the purpose of sabotage, as part of Operation Pastorius (see Ex parte Quirin). In the aftermath of the failure of that operation, Cramer was also arrested and, in 1942, convicted of treason on the basis of this association. Judge Henry W. Goddard sentenced him to 45 years in prison, along with a fine of $10,000.

Cramer appealed his conviction to the Court of Appeals for the Second Circuit, where his conviction was upheld.

Appealing to the court of last resort, the Supreme Court, Cramer was granted certiorari on November 8, 1943.

The case was originally argued on March 9, 1944; reargued on November 6, 1944; and finally decided on April 23, 1945.

Before the Supreme Court, Harold Medina, a future Federal judge, appeared for Cramer, while Solicitor General Charles Fahy defended the actions of the government.

Opinion 

The Court decided five-to-four to overturn the jury verdict. Writing for the majority, Justice Robert H. Jackson said that the Constitution is clear in its definition of treason, limited to the waging of war, or giving material assistance to an enemy. The prosecution and its witnesses could demonstrate only an association and not that Cramer had given "Aid and Comfort," as defined in Article Three. Jackson wrote that the jury had been given no evidence that Cramer had "even paid for their drinks." As such, the majority opinion held, the associations were insufficient to convict Cramer for treason, and the judgment of the Court of Appeals was reversed.

Writing in dissent, Justice William O. Douglas claimed that acts, though innocent by nature, may serve a treasonous plan. Chief Justice Harlan Fiske Stone concurred with the dissent.

Aftermath 
Cramer later pleaded guilty to a lesser charge of trading with the enemy and was sentenced to six years in prison.

See also
 Ex parte Bollman: an earlier treason case before the Court.

References

External links

1945 in United States case law
United States Constitution Article Three case law
United States Supreme Court cases
Treason Clause case law
United States home front during World War II
United States Supreme Court cases of the Stone Court